Personal visibility may refer to:

 Academic visibility
 Appropriation (art)
 Coolhunting, identifying and using trends 
 Feasibility study, the estimation of a companies future performance 
 Iconize, to promote oneself as a representative of a culture
 Personal branding, influence over a companies promotion of a personal brand and how to stay on-Brand
 Promotion (marketing), make popular related brands to a topic of interest to enhance reputation as a consultant or business professional
 Résumé, attractiveness to employers for certain skill sets that match what companies are looking for